Svimon (9 November 1683 – 27 January 1740) was a Georgian prince royal (batonishvili) of the Bagrationi dynasty of House of Mukhrani of Kartli and a natural son of Levan of Kartli by an unknown concubine. Svimon ruled Kartli as a regent from 1712 to 1714 during the absence of his half-brother Vakhtang VI at the Safavid court in Iran. Afterwards, he switched sides between Vakhtang and his renegade sibling Jesse and ended up in exile in the Russian Empire as part of Vakhtang's entourage.

Early life and career 
Svimon became involved in the politics and administration of the country during the regency of his half-brother, Vakhtang, who ruled Kartli, with his capital at Tbilisi, in the absence of the two successive kings, his uncle George XI (Gurgin Khan) and his brother Kaikhosro (Kay Khusraw Khan), at the Safavid Iranian military service in Afghanistan, from 1703 to 1712. During this period of time, Svimon stood by Vakhtang, a prolific ruler, who substantially revised the Georgian law and oversaw a series of political reforms and cultural projects.

Regency 

After the death of Kaikhosro on the Afghan front in 1711, Vakhtang repaired to Isfahan to receive his investiture from Shah Sultan Husayn in 1712, leaving Svimon as a regent (janeshin) in Kartli. Vakhtang was detained in Iran and was unable to return to his kingdom until after he had to accede to the shah's request to convert to Islam in 1716. During his tenure, Svimon continued to support Vakhtang's cultural projects, such as sponsoring the recently opened printing press in Tbilisi and, further, revived a monetary series in copper with specifically Georgian features in parallel to the standard Safavid silver coinage struck at the shah's mint in Tbilisi.

In the meantime, political intrigues in Tbilisi were rife. Uncertainty over Vakhtang's prospect of returning was seen by Svimon no less than Vakhtang's other siblings—Prince Jesse and, as suspected, even the head of the Georgian Orthodox Church Catholicos Domentius—as an opportunity to advance their regal ambitions. Svimon arrested the catholicos and sent him for punishment to Vakhtang's son Prince Bakar, but the prelate was saved thanks to the intervention of Vakhtang's wife Rusudan. The shah was dissatisfied with Svimon, ostensibly, on account of his abuse of power. In this time of a general crisis in the country, Svimon had indeed amassed personal wealth. Another possible reason of him falling out of favor with the shah was Svimon's connection with the French Lazarist missionary, the abbé Jean Richard, who accompanied Vakhtang's envoy Sulkhan-Saba Orbeliani in a mission to Rome and Paris, pleading for pressure on the shah to release Vakhtang.

Between Jesse and Vakhtang 
The shah's plenipotentiary Kholofa, arriving in Tbilisi in 1714, successfully lobbied for more amenable Prince Jesse (Shah Quli Khan), a convert to Islam. Svimon also joined the endeavor and the party obtained confirmation for Jesse as king instead of Vakhtang. Relying on the Iranian support, Jesse harassed Vakhtang's immediate family and supporters. After Vakhtang at last became a Muslim, the shah, tired of Jesse's inefficient rule, confirmed Vakhtang on the throne and nominated his son Bakar regent of Kartli until Vakhtang's own return there. Bakar cast Jesse in prison and repressed his allies, but Svimon was spared. He was, further, put in command of a force, which defeated the marauding Lesgian bands in Kvemo Kartli in 1717.

After Vakhtang's return to Kartli in 1719, Svimon retired from the politics and government and lived in his estate at Beshtasheni in Somkhiti. In 1723, when Constantine II of Kakheti put Tbilisi under siege, Svimon was put by Vakhtang in charge of defense of the strategic Avlabari Bridge at Tbilisi, but the prince failed in his mission and Constantine II succeeded in dislodging Vakhtang from his capital. Svimon was then with Vakhtang and Bakar in their guerrilla war and, joined by Shanshe, Duke of Ksani, attacked, unsuccessfully, Constantine's Lesgian mercenaries in the Tsilkani fortress, north of Tbilisi. Eventually, Svimon followed Vakhtang, dispossessed of his kingdom, into an exile in the Russian Empire, while Jesse once again attained to the throne of Kartli, this time under the Ottoman hegemony. Svimon, known in Russia as the tsarevich Simeon Leonovich died at the age of 56 in 1740. He was buried at the Alexander Nevsky Lavra.

Family 
Svimon was married twice; he first married, in 1712, Gulkan (Guka; died 1717), daughter of Bardzim, Duke of Aragvi, and then, already a widower, Ana (fl. 1724 – 1745), daughter of Prince Paata Amilakhvari. Svimon had two sons by his first marriage—Beri (fl. 1724) and Archil—and two sons by his second marriage—Stepane (1727–1744) and Dimitri (1729–1745). Svimon's first wife and many of his household died in an outbreak of plague in 1717 and the prince built a church in Tbilisi in their honor. His son of the second marriage, Prince Dimitri married in Russia, in 1743, as her third husband, Princess Stepanida Rzhevskaya (1705–1762), former wife of Prince Aleksandr Galitzine and of Colonel Iakinf Alymov.

Prince Svimon also had two natural sons—Nikoloz (Nikolay; born 28 November 1729) and Mikheil (fl. 1734). Svimon's widow Anna filed a complaint to the Russian senate, requesting that Nikoloz, as an extramarital child, not be allowed to bear the Bagration surname. Instead, he was authorized by the Russian crown, in 1741, to have the title of prince and to henceforth call himself Prince Nikolay Semyonov. He was a dragoon officer and had a son, Fyodor (born 1764). The Semyonov line has since been extinct.

Ancestry

Notes

References 

  
 
 
 
 

1683 births
1740 deaths
Georgian princes
18th-century viceregal rulers
Safavid governors of Kartli
17th-century people from Georgia (country)
18th-century people from Georgia (country)
Regents of Georgia
Illegitimate children of Levan of Kartli
17th-century people of Safavid Iran
18th-century people of Safavid Iran